Alexander is a surname originating in Scotland, originally an Anglicised form of the Scottish Gaelic MacAlasdair. It is a somewhat common Scottish name, and the region of Scotland where it traditionally is most commonly found is in the Highlands region of Scotland.

Notable people with the surname include:

 Adonis Alexander (born 1996), American football player
 AJ Alexander (born 1980), American model and Playboy Playmate
 A. V. Alexander, 1st Earl Alexander of Hillsborough (1885–1965), British politician
 Albert R. Alexander (1859–1966), American judge
 Amir Alexander (born 1963), Israeli-American historian
 Ana Alexander (born 1954), Cuban long-jumper
 Ann Dunlop Alexander (1896–1969), Scottish artist
 Annie Lowrie Alexander (1864–1929), American physician and educator
 Archibald Alexander (1772–1851), American theologian, professor, and first principal of Princeton Seminary
 Archibald Alexander (politician) (1755–1822), American physician and politician
 Archibald Alphonso Alexander (1888–1958), American design and construction engineer
 Archibald S. Alexander (1906–1979), American lawyer, civil servant, and Democratic politician
 Archie Alexander (1888–1958), American engineer and architect
 Barton S. Alexander (1819–1878), U.S. Army brigadier general and engineer during the American Civil War
 Beatrice Alexander (1895–1990), American dollmaker and businesswoman
 Bevin Alexander (born 1929), American military historian and author 
 Birdie Alexander (1870–1960), American musician and educator
 Boyd Alexander (1873–1910), British army officer, explorer and ornithologist
 Blaise Alexander (1976–2001), American racing driver
 Caleb Alexander (1755–1828), American clergyman, writer, teacher
 Cecil Alexander (1918–2013), American architect
 Cecil L. Alexander (born 1935), American politician
 Cecil Frances Alexander (1818–1895), British hymn-writer and poet
 Charles A. Alexander (1827–1888), American architect
 Charles Paul Alexander (1889–1981), American entomologist
 Christopher Alexander (1936–2022), Austrian-American architect and design theorist
 Christopher James Alexander (1887–1917), British ornithologist
 Chuffie Alexander (1902–1989), American baseball player
 Claudia Alexander (1959–2015), American planetary scientist
 Conel Hugh O'Donel Alexander (1909–1974), British cryptanalyst, chess player, and chess writer
 Cory Alexander (born 1973), American basketball player
 Courtney Alexander (born 1977), American basketball player
 Cris Alexander (1920–2012), American actor, singer, dancer, designer, and photographer
 Danny Alexander (born 1972), British politician
 Dari Alexander (born 1969), American news anchor
 Devon Alexander (born 1987), American professional boxer
 Doc Alexander (1897–1975), American NFL football player and coach
 Donald Alexander (disambiguation), several people
 Dorothy Alexander, professional name of Dorothy Bohm (born 1924), naturalized British photographer
 Dottie Alexander (born 1972), American keyboardist
 Douglas Alexander (born 1967), British politician
 Duane Alexander (1940–2020), American doctor
 Eben Alexander (author) (born 1953), American neurosurgeon
 Edward Porter Alexander (1835–1910), U.S. and Confederate States Army officer
 Ethel Skyles Alexander (1925–2016), American politician
 Evan Shelby Alexander (1767–1809), American politician
 F. Matthias Alexander (1869–1955), Australian actor/orator, founder of the Alexander Technique
 Francesca Alexander (1837–1917), American illustrator, author, and translator
 Frank Alexander (cricketer) (1911–2005), Australian cricketer
 Franz Alexander (1891–1964), Hungarian-American psychoanalyst and physician
 Fred Alexander (disambiguation), several people
 Gary Alexander (disambiguation), several people
 Grover Cleveland Alexander (1887–1950), American baseball player
 Gus Alexander (1934–2010), Scottish footballer
 Harry Alexander (disambiguation), including Harold Alexander, several people
 Holmes Alexander (1906–1985), American historian, journalist, and columnist
 Horace Alexander (1889–1989), English writer, pacifist and ornithologist
 Howard Wright Alexander (1911–1985), Canadian-American mathematician
 Hubbard Alexander (1939–2016), American football player
 J. Alexander (model) (born 1958), American model, runway coach and panelist on America's Next Top Model
 Jace Alexander (born 1964), American television director and actor
 Jaire Alexander (born 1997), American football player
 James Alexander (disambiguation), several people
 Jane Alexander (born 1939), American actress and author
 Jane Grace Alexander (1848–1932), American banker
 Jason Alexander (disambiguation), several people
 Jay Alexander (born 1968), American magician, comedian and entertainer
 Jean Alexander (1926–2016), British actress
 Jeffrey C. Alexander (born 1947), American sociologist
 Joan Alexander (1915–2009), American actress
 Joe Alexander (born 1986), American-Israeli basketball player in the Israel Basketball Premier League
 John Alexander (disambiguation), several people
 Joseph Alexander (disambiguation), several people
 Juliet Alexander (born 1950s), Guyanese-born British journalist and TV presenter
 Kaitlyn Alexander (born 1992), Canadian actress
 Kita Alexander (born 1996), Australian pop singer-songwriter
 Lamar Alexander (born 1940), American politician
 Lawrence A. Alexander (born 1943), American law professor
 Lena Alexander (1899–1983), Scottish artist 
 Lincoln Alexander (1922–2012), Canadian politician
 Lloyd Alexander (1924–2007), American author
 Louise Alexander (born 1960), American politician, member of the Alabama House of Representatives
 Lucy Alexander (born 1970), British television presenter
 Manny Alexander (born 1971), Dominican Republic-born American baseball player
 Margie Alexander (1948–2013), American singer
 Mary C. Alexander (1893–1955), American aviation pioneer
 Milton Alexander (1796–1856), American militia officer, attorney, and politician
 Neil Alexander (born 1978), Scottish footballer
 Nykolai Aleksander (born 1978), German artist
 Odicci Alexander (born 1998), American softball player
 Olly Alexander (born 1990), English musician; lead singer of Years & Years
 Ora Alexander (born c.1896–unknown), American classic female blues singer
 Patrick Young Alexander (1867–1943), British aviation pioneer
 Peter Alexander (disambiguation), several people
 Richard D. Alexander (1930–2018), American zoologist and professor
 Rex Alexander (1924–1982), American college sports coach
 Robert Alexander (disambiguation), several people
 Robin Alexander, British educationist and academic
 Robin Alexander (journalist) (born 1975), German journalist and author
 Ross Alexander (1907–1937), American actor
 Sally Hobart Alexander (born 1943), American writer of children's literature
 Samuel Alexander (1859–1938), Australian/British philosopher and essayist
 Sarah Alexander (born 1971), British actress
 Scott Alexander (born 1989), American baseball player
 Shane Alexander, 2nd Earl Alexander of Tunis (born 1935), British peer
 Shane Alexander (musician) (late 20th/early 21st c.), American singer-songwriter and musician
 Shane Alexander (volleyball) (born 1986), Australian volleyball player
 Shaun Alexander (born 1977), American football player
 Sofia Alexander, Mexican animator and voice actor
 Stan Alexander (1905–1961), English footballer
 Stephanie B. Alexander, American mathematician
 Sue Alexander (1933–2008), American children's author
 Thomas Alexander (disambiguation), several people
 Travis Alexander, murder victim – see Murder of Travis Alexander
 Tyler Alexander (born 1994), American baseball player
 Ty-Shon Alexander (born 1998), American basketball player
 Van Alexander (1915–2015), American bandleader, arranger and composer, born Alexander Van Vliet Feldman
 Victor Alexander (born 1969), American basketball player
 Wilfred Backhouse Alexander (1885–1965), English ornithologist and entomologist
 William Alexander (disambiguation), several people

See also 
 Aleksander (Hasidic dynasty)
 J. Alexander (disambiguation)
 Alexander (disambiguation)

References 

English-language surnames
Jewish surnames
Surnames from given names